Gagea altaica is an Asian species of plants in the lily family, native to Kazakhstan, Siberia (Tuva, Altay Krai, Krasnoyarsk), and Xinjiang Province of western China.

Gagea altaica is a bulb-forming perennial up to 12 cm tall. Flowers are golden yellow to yellow-brown, usually only one or two per plant but sometimes more.

References

External links
Plantarium Gagea altaica Schischk. & Sumnev. (семейство Liliaceae) Гусиный лук алтайский in Russian with color photo

altaica
Flora of Asia
Plants described in 1929